The 1999 Vietnamese floods affected Vietnam in late 1999 and were the worst floods the country had experienced in a century. The floods were caused by a series of storms that brought heavy rain to the central part of the country in October and November. The first storm to hit was Tropical Storm Eve on October 19 and the main event occurred from November 1-November 6. In total, 595 people lost their lives and 55,000 were made homeless. The floods caused $290 million of damage to the region and caused a further $490 million of economic losses. It is estimated that 1.7 million people in the central Provinces of Vietnam were affected by the floods.

See also
Friends of Hue Foundation

References

External links
The role of local institutions in reducing vulnerability to recurrent natural disasters and in sustainable livelihoods development. Case Study: Vietnam (FAO)
World Disaster Reports 2001 (ICRC)

1999
1999 floods in Asia
Floods
1999 disasters in Vietnam